Peter Graham Kaestner (b. 1953 Baltimore, Maryland) is a retired American diplomat and amateur ornithologist who most recently served as the chief of the Consular Section at the U.S. Consulate General in Frankfurt, Germany.  From May 2013 to 2014 he was the Senior Civilian Representative in Northern Afghanistan, based at Camp Marmal, Mazar-e Sharif.  From 2009 to late 2012 he was a senior inspector in the Office of Inspector General of the U.S. State Department.  From 2006 to 2009 he was the Minister Counselor for Consular Affairs of the American Embassy in New Delhi, India.  As Minister Counselor, he oversaw consular operations in New Delhi and the U.S. Consulates Generals in Mumbai (Bombay), Chennai (Madras), Hyderabad, and Kolkata (Calcutta).  He retired from the Foreign Service in August 2016.

Born in Baltimore, Maryland, in 1953 to Benjamin Henry Kaestner, Jr. and Alice (Reed) Kaestner, he is the middle child of 10 siblings and step-siblings. After spending two years in the Peace Corps in Zaire, Kaestner entered the Foreign Service in 1980, and has been assigned in the past to India, Egypt, Brazil, Guatemala, New Guinea, the Solomon Islands, Colombia, Malaysia, and Namibia.  In 1990 he had his first child with his wife Kimberly Vreeland Kaestner, Katherine Kaestner. In 1991 the couple had a second child, Laurel Kaestner.

An avid birder, he has taken advantage of his position as an international diplomat to follow his hobby. By October 1986, he had become the first birder to see a representative of each bird family in the world and was recognized in the Guinness World Records. In 1989, while on a birding expedition near Bogota, Colombia, where he was a U.S. consular officer, he discovered a species new to science, the Cundinamarca Antpitta (Grallaria kaestneri), which was subsequently named after him. (See Antpitta.)  

With a life list of 9,685 /9,685  /9,474 birds, Kaestner is one of the most notable birders in the world, where he is the Number 1 eBirder, and is only surpassed by Claes-Göran Cederlund on the Surfbirds World Bird Species Life List (as of 22 December, 2022).

References

 Koeppel, Dan.  To See Every Bird On Earth: A Father, A Son, and a Lifelong Obsession, (Penguin: 2005).  

1953 births
American ornithologists
American diplomats
Living people